John Proby may refer to:

John Proby (died 1710), MP for Huntingdonshire
John Proby (died 1762), MP for Huntingdonshire and Stamford
John Proby, 1st Baron Carysfort, British politician, son of the above
John Joshua Proby, 1st Earl of Carysfort, British politician, son of the above
John Proby, 2nd Earl of Carysfort, British soldier and politician, son of the above